The 1966 New Zealand general election was a nationwide vote to determine the shape of the New Zealand Parliament's 35th term. It saw the governing National Party win a third consecutive term in office. It was also the first time since the 1943 election that a minor party won a seat in Parliament.

Background
The National Party had established its second administration following the 1960 elections, and had been re-elected in the 1963 election. Keith Holyoake remained Prime Minister. The Labour Party experienced a leadership change shortly before the 1966 elections: Arnold Nordmeyer, who was closely associated with an unpopular previous Labour government, was replaced by the younger Norman Kirk. Labour remained disunited, however, with ongoing leadership problems undermining Kirk's position. Disagreement between unionists and non-unionists regarding economic policy also weakened the party.

One significant issue that divided National and Labour in the 1966 elections was the question of New Zealand's participation in the Vietnam War. Under National, New Zealand contributed a small number of troops, which Holyoake strongly defended during  the election campaign. Labour, by contrast, made the recall of troops one of its key policies; former Labour leader Walter Nash was a particularly strong critic of the war. Nash believed that Labour's failure to win the election was because of its principled anti-Vietnam war policy, despite voters preferring Labour's economic policy to National's.

MPs retiring in 1966
Eight National MPs and two Labour MPs intended to retire at the end of the 34th Parliament.

The election

The date for the main 1966 elections was 26 November. 1,409,600 people were registered to vote. Turnout was 86.0%, a number relatively low for the time. The number of seats being contested was 80, a number which had been fixed since 1902. It was, however, the last election in which the number of seats was set at this level.

Election results

Party standings
The 1966 election saw the governing National Party retain office by an eight-seat margin. It had previously held office by a ten-seat margin — the drop was a result of losing the Hobson seat to Social Credit's Vernon Cracknell. National won a total of forty-four seats, while the Labour Party remained static on thirty-five. In the popular vote, the parties were closer — National won 43.6% to Labour's 41.4%. The Social Credit Party won 14.5% of the vote and one seat.

Votes summary

Initial MPs
The table below shows the results of the 1966 general election:

Key

|-
 |colspan=8 style="background-color:#FFDEAD" | General electorates
|-

|-
 | Hauraki
 | style="background-color:;" |
 | colspan=3 style="text-align:center;background-color:;" | Arthur Kinsella
 | style="text-align:right;" | 2,336
 | style="background-color:;" |
 | style="text-align:center;" | Henry Uttinger
|-

|-
 |colspan=8 style="background-color:#FFDEAD" | Māori electorates
|-

|}

Notes

References

 
November 1966 events in New Zealand